In molecular biology, Endoribonuclease XendoU  refers to a protein domain. This particular entry represents endoribonucleases involved in RNA biosynthesis which has been named XendoU in Xenopus laevis (African clawed frog). This protein domain belongs to  a family of evolutionarily related proteins. XendoU is a U-specific metal dependent enzyme that produces products with a 2'-3' cyclic phosphate termini.

Function
The endonuclease, XendoU, is highly involved in the biosynthesis of a specific subclass of Xenopus laevis encoded small nucleolar RNAs (snoRNA) which are a large family of non-coding RNAs with essential roles in ribosome biogenesis. Most  snoRNAs are encoded in introns and are released through the splicing reaction.  Others, instead, produced by an alternative pathway consisting of endonucleolytic processing of pre-mRNA. XendoU, is the endoribonuclease responsible for this activity.

The XendoU-RNA complex is manganese (Mn2+)-independent. This infers that RNA binding and processing activities can be functionally separated since ions are essential for cleavage.

Structure
XendoU is a single-domain protein with roughly globular shape. It contains nine alpha helices and three antiparallel beta sheets; the latter are clustered on one side of the protein.

Homology
XendoU has no homology to any known cellular RNase. However, it has sequence similarity with proteins tentatively annotated as serine proteases.

References

Protein families
Protein domains